Charles Hall (24 September 1847 – 6 June 1909) was a member of the Wisconsin State Assembly.

Biography
Hall was born in London, England in 1847. He later resided in De Pere, Wisconsin and Oconto, Wisconsin. During the American Civil War, he served with the 39th Wisconsin Volunteer Infantry Regiment of the Union Army.

Political career
Hall was elected to the Assembly in 1886 and 1888. Other positions he held include President of the Oconto city council. He was a Republican.

References

1847 births
1909 deaths
English emigrants to the United States
Republican Party members of the Wisconsin State Assembly
People from De Pere, Wisconsin
People from Oconto, Wisconsin
People of Wisconsin in the American Civil War
Union Army soldiers
Wisconsin city council members
19th-century American politicians